There are 15 counties in the U.S. state of Arizona. Four counties (Mohave, Pima, Yavapai and Yuma) were created in 1864 following the organization of the Arizona Territory in 1862. The now defunct Pah-Ute County was split from Mohave County in 1865, but merged back in 1871. All but La Paz County were created by the time Arizona was granted statehood in 1912. La Paz County was established in 1983 after many years of pushing for independence from Yuma County.

Eight of Arizona's fifteen counties are named after various Native American groups that are resident in parts of what is now Arizona, with another (Cochise County) being named after a native leader. Four other counties, Gila County, Santa Cruz County, Pinal County, and Graham County, are named for physical features of Arizona's landscape: the Gila River, the Santa Cruz River, Pinal Peak, and Mount Graham, respectively. Another county, La Paz County, is named after a former settlement, while the final county, Greenlee County, is named after one of the state's early pioneers.

Under Arizona laws, a county shall not be formed or divided by county initiative unless each proposed county would have all of the following characteristics: (1) at least three-fourths of one percent of the total state assessed valuation and at least the statewide per capita assessed valuation; (2) a population of at least three-fourths of one percent of the total state population according to the most recent United States decennial census; (3) at least one hundred square miles of privately owned land; (4) common boundaries with either (a) at least three other existing or proposed counties; or (b) at least two other existing or proposed counties and the state boundary. A county formation commission is required to be formed to evaluate the feasibility of the proposed county. A proposal to divide a county must be approved by a majority of the votes cast in each proposed new county.

Under the Arizona Constitution, counties are politically and legally creatures of the state, and do not have charters of their own. Counties are governed by boards of supervisors which act in the capacity of executive authority for the county within the statutes and powers prescribed by Arizona state law. With few exceptions, these powers are narrowly construed. The state legislature devotes considerable time to local matters, with limited discretion granted to the Board of Supervisors on minor ordinance, zoning, and revenue collection issues.

Arizona's postal abbreviation is AZ and its FIPS code is 04.


Alphabetical listing

|}

Excluded counties

 Doña Ana County, New Mexico Territory
 Rio Arriba County, New Mexico Territory
 Santa Ana County, New Mexico Territory
 Socorro County, New Mexico Territory
 Taos County, New Mexico Territory
 Valencia County, New Mexico Territory

Extinct counties
 Pah-Ute County, Arizona Territory (1865–1871), now part of Clark County, Nevada and Mohave County, Arizona

Proposed counties 
 Butte County: In 1897, James C. Goodwin, with the support of Charles T. Hayden and others, introduced a bill at the Territorial Legislature to split Maricopa County into two, with Tempe being the county seat. There have also been proposals, introduced in 1900 and 1913, to divide Maricopa County, with Mesa as the new county's seat.
 Sierra Bonita County: proposed at the 13th Arizona Territorial Legislature in 1885, with Willcox proposed as the county seat. The proposal died by one vote.

See also 
 Arizona Association of Counties

References

Arizona, List of counties in
 
Counties